Crossobamon is a genus of lizards of the gecko family Gekkonidae.

Species
The genus Crossobamon contains two species:

Crossobamon eversmanni 
Crossobamon orientalis 

The latter species is poorly described, and was formerly considered a member of the genus Stenodactylus.

Etymology
The genus name: Gr. κροσσοι krossoi "tassels, fringe"; βαινω bainō "to walk". The specific name, eversmanni, is in honor of German-born Russian biologist Alexander Eduard Friedrich Eversmann.

Geographic range
Geckos of the genus Crossobamon live in Pakistan, Afghanistan, Russia, and Central Asia.

Description

References

External links
Photos

 
Reptiles of Pakistan
Lizards of Asia
Geckos
Lizard genera
Taxa named by Oskar Boettger